Dannet is a village and rural commune in Niger. As of 2011, the commune had a total population of 10,212 people.

References

Communes of Niger